Ted Collins (October 12, 1900 – May 27, 1964) was an American show business manager, best known for managing singer and TV show star Kate Smith, (1907–1986) for thirty years.

Collins was also involved in professional sports, as owner of the National Football League's franchises Boston Yanks (1944–48) and which followed as the New York Bulldogs/Yanks (1949–51) - later became  the Dallas Texans in 1952. He was considerably more successful in entertainment management than as an oldtime NFL owner.

Collins died at age 63 in May 1964, of a heart attack in Lake Placid, New York at a doctor's office. He had previous health issues, including a heart attack in 1956.

References

External links

1900 births
1964 deaths
National Football League owners
20th-century American businesspeople